New York Connection is an album by American musician Tom Scott that was released by Ode in December 1975 with a UK release following in April 1976. It entered the Billboard 200 on 20 December to begin a chart stay of 25 weeks, peaking at number 42.

In contrast with the Los Angeles-based Scott's previous projects, the nine-song set features New York musicians such as Hugh McCracken, Richard Tee, Eric Gale, and Steve Gadd. Following their North American tour together in November−December 1974, George Harrison makes a contribution on the track "Appolonia (Foxtrata)".

Track listing 
All songs composed and arranged by Tom Scott, except where noted.

 "Dirty Old Man" – 5:20
 "Uptown & Country" – 6:19
 "New York Connection" – 4:24
 "Garden" (Ackerman, Michel Colombier) – 5:37
 "Time and Love" (Ralph MacDonald, Laura Nyro, William Salter) – 4:33
 "Midtown Rush" – 4:47
 "Looking Out for Number 7" – 5:34
 "Appolonia (Foxtrata)" – 3:59
 "You're Gonna Need Me" (Richard Tee) – 4:40

Personnel
 Tom Scott – saxophones, flute, Moog synthesizer, lyricon, ARP strings
 Chuck Findley – trumpet
 Dick Hyde – trombone, bass trumpet
 Richard Tee – keyboards
 Bob James – electric piano
 George Harrison – slide guitar (8)
 Hugh McCracken – guitar, slide guitar (2), harmonica
 Eric Gale – guitar, bass (9)
 Gary King – bass (except for 9)
 Steve Gadd – drums
 Ralph MacDonald – percussion

References

1975 albums
Tom Scott (saxophonist) albums
Ode Records albums
Jazz fusion albums by American artists